Jeon Seong-woo (born December 30, 1987) is a South Korean actor.

Career
Jeon debuted as a musical actor at the age of 20 in the musical Royal Dream of the Moon in which he portrayed the young version of Jeongjo of Joseon. He has since appeared in ten other musicals and cinq plays. For his portrayal of Michael in The Elephant Song and of Christopher in The Curious Incident of the Dog in the Night-Time, Jeon won the Best Actor Award in the Theater Category at the 2016 Stagetalk Audience Choice Awards.

In February 2015, Jeon signed with Great Company and consequently made his television debut in the sageuk Six Flying Dragons in which he was only credited as a student. The following year, he played a fellow in the department of anesthesiology in the medical melodrama A Beautiful Mind. He also made his film debut in The Table. In 2017, he appeared in the crime drama Oh, the Mysterious.

In July 2018, Jeon signed with High Entertainment and later appeared in Too Bright for Romance and Water Scale, respectively from the KBS Drama Special and tvN Drama Stage projects.

In 2019, Jeon portrayed a priest in the comedy crime drama The Fiery Priest which recorded the highest average rating of the year (16.1% nationwide and 18.1% in Seoul), as well as an NIS terrorism task force cyber specialist in the political thriller Designated Survivor: 60 Days and a rookie prosecutor in the legal television series Diary of a Prosecutor.

Filmography

Film

Television series

Web series

Variety show

Music video appearances

Theater

Plays

Musicals

Awards and nominations

References

External links 
 Jeon Seong-woo at High Entertainment 
 

1987 births
Living people
South Korean male film actors
South Korean male television actors
South Korean male stage actors
South Korean male musical theatre actors
Sungkyunkwan University alumni
People from Seoul